Greece has competed in every IAAF World Championships in Athletics since the event's first edition in 1983.

Summary
*Red border color indicates tournament was held on home soil.

Medalists

Doping disqualifications

See also 
Greece at the IAAF World Indoor Championships in Athletics
Greece at the European Athletics Championships
Greece at the European Athletics Indoor Championships

References 

 
Greece
World Championships in Athletics